The 2016–17 Pro Tour season was the twenty-second season of the Magic: The Gathering Pro Tour. It started on 13 August 2016 with Grand Prix Portland and Rimini and ended on 30 July 2017 with the conclusion of Pro Tour Kyoto. The season consisted of 49 Grand Prix and 4 Pro Tours, located in Honolulu, Dublin, Nashville, and Kyoto.

Grand Prix 

GP Portland (13–14 August 2016)
Format: Standard
Attendance: 1712
 Robert Santana
 Travis Woo
 Tanner Von Difloe
 Max Mick
 Chris Botelho
 Oliver Tomajko
 Paul Rietzl
 Michael Hantz

GP Indianapolis (27–28 August 2016)
Format: Modern
Attendance: 1983
 Brandon Burton
 Rob Pisano
 Scott Lipp
 Brandon Semerau
 Ryan Normandin
 Mason Linne
 Ryan Solave
 Brandon Pascal

GP Rimini (13–14 August 2016)
Format: Standard
Attendance: 878
 Arne Huschenbeth
 Petr Sochurek
 Simon Enckels
 Marco Dolazza
 Lukas Blohon
 Shouta Yasooka
 Jaroslav Boucek
 Thomas Holzinger

GP Guangzhou (27–28 August 2016)
Format: Modern
Attendance: 946
 Albertus Law
 Wu Kon Fai
 Lim Zhong Yi
 Kelvin Chew
 Jia Hao
 Ryoichi Tamada
 Kentaro Yamamoto
 Keita Kawasaki

GP Lille (27–28 August 2016)
Attendance: 1818
Format: Modern
 Meciek Berger
 Thomas Hendriks
 Jiří Obraz
 Serafin Wellinger
 Mike Boulinguiez
 André Metzger
 Manuel Menges
 Danel Ballestin

Magic: The Gathering World Championship 
Seattle (1–4 September 2016)
 Prize pool: $250,000
 Format: Booster Draft, Standard, Modern

Top 4 playoff

Final standings 

The following twenty-four players received an invitation to the 2016 World Championship due to their performance in the 2015–16 season. They are ordered according to the final standings of the event.

Grand Prix 

GP Louisville (10–11 September 2016)
Format: Team Limited
Attendance: 1383 (461 teams)
1.
 Sam Black
 Matt Severa
 Justin Cohen
2.
 Ben Rubin
 Matthew Boccio
 Tillman Bragg
3. 
 Steve Rubin
 Alexander Hayne
 Mike Sigrist
4
 Paul Rietzl
 Matthew Sperling
 Jelger Wiegersma

GP London (8–9 October 2016)
Format: Limited
Attendance: 1663
 Márcio Carvalho
 Gabor Kocsis
 Pip Griffiths
 Neil Rigby
 Bo Stentebjerg-Hansen
 Federico Del Basso
 Marcus Hensing
 Riccardo Picciafuochi

GP Kyoto (10–11 September 2016)
Format: Team Limited
Attendance: 2334 (778 teams)
1.
 Yuki Matsumoto
 Yuuki Ichikawa
 Kazuyuki Takimura
2.
 Kitahara Hiroaki
 Ken Yukuhiro
 Kentaro Yamamoto
3. 
 Kenta Harane
 Fumiya Matsumoto
 Tomonori Hirami
4
 Tom Ristovsky
 Petr Sochurek
 Pavel Matousek

GP Atlanta (8–9 October 2016)
Format: Limited
Attendance: 1663
 Carlos Romão
 Cash Turner
 Noah Walker
 Raymond Perez Jr.
 Geddes Cooper
 Christopher Fennell
 Thien Nguyen
 Matt Frank

Pro Tour Kaladesh 
Honolulu (14–16 October 2016)
 Prize pool: $250,000
 Format: Standard, Booster Draft

Top 8

Final standings

Pro Player of the year standings

Grand Prix 

GP Providence (22–23 October 2016)
Format: Standard
Attendance: 1180
 Wang Yichen
 Seth Manfield
 Jacky Wang
 Osyp Lebedowicz
 Zachary Kiihne
 Maxim Belanger 
 Dave Shiels
 Ian Bosley

GP Santiago (29–30 October 2016)
Format: Standard
Attendance: 1180
 John Chavarria
 Jonathan Lobo Melamed
 Eduardo dos Santos Vieira
 Victor Fernando Silva
 Luis Salvatto
 Cristian Cespedes 
 Ignacio Garcia
 Marcos Paulo De Jesus Freitas

GP Kuala Lumpur (22–23 October 2016)
Format: Standard
Attendance: 769
 Fumiya Matsumoto
 Mark Lawrence Tubola
 Yuuki Ichikawa
 Anthony Lee
 Yuuta Takahashi
 Marcus Oh 
 Au Yong Wai Kin
 Teruya Kakumae

GP Dallas (5–6 November 2016)
Format: Modern
Attendance: 2019
 Kevin Mackie
 Corey Burkhart
 Michael Mei
 Alex Mitas
 Brian Braun-Duin
 Nicolas D'Ambrose
 Zach Voss
 Phillip Napoli

GP Warsaw (29–30 October 2016)
Format: Standard
Attendance: 1112
 Gabrielius Kaklauskas
 Niels Molle
 Andreas Ganz
 Matteo Moure
 Zbysek Panchartek
 Ben Stark
 Julien Stihle
 Oleksii Riabokon

GP Rotterdam (12–13 November 2016)
Format: Team Limited
Attendance: 2109 (703 teams)
1.
 Javier Dominguez
 Márcio Carvalho
 Luis Salvatto
2.
 Frank Karsten
 Brent Vos
 Bas Melis
3.
 Raphaël Lévy
 Tomoharu Saitou
 Jérémy Dezani
4.
 Ondřej Stráský
 Paulo Vitor Damo da Rosa
 Shahar Shenhar

World Magic Cup 
Rotterdam (18–20 November 2016)
 Prize pool: $250,000 
 Format: Team Constructed, Team Limited

Top 8

Final standings

Pro Player of the year standings

Grand Prix 

GP Chiba (26–27 November 2016)
Format: Legacy
Attendance: 2503
 Kentaro Yamamoto
 Atsuki Kihara
 Yuuya Watanabe
 Keisuke Sato
 Kouichi Miyabe
 Ryo Takahashi
 Akira Honma
 Liu Jin

GP Milwaukee (10–11 December 2016)
Format: Limited
Attendance: 1331
 Steven Carter
 Brandon Fisher
 Eric Severson
 Evan Petre
 Ari Lax
 Toshiya Kanegawa
 Benjamin Weitz
 Corey Brukhart

GP Prague (28–29 January 2017)
Format: Limited
Attendance: 2005
 Yusuf Kemal Vefa
 Paulo Vitor Damo da Rosa
 Fabian Friedrich
 Roope Metsä
 Christoffer Larsen
 Ivan Floch
 Florian Koch
 Fabrizio Campanino

GP Denver (3–4 December 2016)
Format: Standard
Attendance: 1568
 Matt Severa
 Steve Rubin
 Jacob Nagro
 Andrew Wolbers
 Rob Pisano
 Ben Hull
 Michael Snyder
 Seth Manfield

GP Louisville (7–8 January 2017)
Format: Legacy
Attendance:1610
 Reid Duke
 Andrew Sullano
 Brian Braun-Duin
 Nate Barton
 Charles Hinkle
 Michael Majors
 Cody Napier
 Craig Wescoe

GP Madrid (3–4 December 2016)
Format: Standard
Attendance: 1456
 Carmine D'Aniello
 Nicolas Legendre
 Callum Bousfield
 Marco Cammilluzzi
 Rafael Sarriegui Hidalgo
 Adrian Ramiro Cano
 Luis Gobern
 Alexander Hottmann

GP San Jose (28–29 January 2017)
Format: Limited
Attendance: 1908
 John Asbach
 Ari Hausman-Cohen
 Roberto Berni
 Avenash Pernankil
 Jiachen Tao
 Anand Khare
 Adam Ragsdale
 Richard Tan

Pro Tour Aether Revolt 
Dublin (3–5 February 2017)
 Prize pool: $250,000
 Format: Standard, Booster Draft

Top 8

Final standings

Pro Player of the year standings

Team Series standing

Grand Prix 

GP Pittsburgh (11–12 February 2017)
Format: Standard
Attendance: 1334
 Ryan Hare
 Bronson Gervasi
 Matthew Long
 Robert Beatty
 Adam Van Fleet
 Daniel Fournier
 Anand Khare
 Michael Cochran

GP Utrecht (25–26 February 2017)
Format: Standard
Attendance: 1232
 Samuel Vuillot
 Fabrizio Campanino
 Alexandre Habert
 David Brucker
 Charly Traarbach
 Kasper Nielsen
 Thuan Truong
 Berk Akbulut

GP Shizuoka (18–19 March 2017)
Format: Standard
Attendance: 2719
 Ryohei Kirino
 Wentao Qi
 Masayasu Tanahashi
 Yusuke Sasabe
 Sungeun Je
 Takanori Watanabe
 Akihiro Miyamoto
 Motoaki Itou

GP San Antonio (1–2 April 2017)
Format: Team Unified Modern
Attendance: 1668 (556 teams)
1.
 Greg Orange
 Adam Jansen
 Andrejs Prost
2.
 Reid Duke
 William Jensen
 Owen Turtenwald
3.
 Gerard Fabiano
 Eli Kassis
 Ben Lundquist
4.
 David Ochoa
 Matt Severa
 Andrew Baeckstrom

GP Bologna (6–7 May 2017)
Format: Limited
Attendance: 1669
 Corrado De Sio
 Martin Jůza
 Francesco Giorgiio
 Pascal Vieren
 Dario Veneri
 Dario Parazzoli
 Javier Dominguez
 Simon Nielsen

GP Vancouver (18–19 February 2017)
Format: Modern
Attendance: 1552
 Josh Utter-Leyton
 Johnathan Zaczek
 Gerry Thompson
 Sam Black
 Eric Severson
 Jon Stern
 Nathanial Knox
 Jason Simard

GP New Jersey (11–12 March 2017)
Format: Standard
Attendance: 1622
 Corey Baumeister
 Ben Friedman
 Paul Rietzl
 Ben Stark
 Robert Lombardi
 Jarvis Yu
 Kyle Moran
 Brandon Ayers

GP Porto Alegre (18–19 March 2017)
Format: Standard
Attendance: 570
 Victor Silva
 Vagner William Casati
 Francisco Sifuentes
 Rafael Bertolli Parra
 Sebastian Pozzo 
 Luis Salvatto
 Patricio Roman
 Carlos Alexandre Dos Santos Esteves

GP Mexico City (8–9 April 2017)
Format: Team Limited
Attendance: 444 (148 teams)
1.
 Andrew Cuneo
 Eric Froehlich
 Ben Stark
2.
 Matthew Nass
 Jacob Wilson
 Samuel Pardee
3.
 Kazuyuki Takimura
 Shota Takao
 Toru Inoue
4.
 Jon Stern
 Greg Ogreenc
 Stephen Neal

GP Beijing (6–7 May 2017)
Format: Limited
Attendance: 1029
 Kelvin Chew
 Keita Kawasaki
 Tomoharu Saito
 Wu Xuan
 Riku Kumagai
 Takuma Morofuji
 Yi Shimin
 Riki Kamo

GP Brisbane  (18–19 February 2017)
Format: Modern
Attendance: 981
 Oliver Oks
 Zen Takahashi
 Lee Shi Tian
 Timothy Cheng
 Chris Grimshaw
 Tetsu Kawaguchi
 Sean Hume
 James Larsen-Scott

GP Barcelona (11–12 March 2017)
Format: Standard
Attendance: 1265
 Petr Sochůrek
 Matthew Pope
 Márcio Carvalho
 Iñigo Vallejo Pascual
 Michal Lipinski
 Federico Del Basso
 Miguel Castro
 Yoann Sevaux

GP Orlando (25–26 March 2017)
Format: Limited
Attendance: 1284
 Joel Larsson
 Noah Walker
 Zile Yao
 Chris Pikula
 Alexander Hayne
 Jack Dobbin
 Patrick Tierney
 Jorge Mantilla

GP Richmond (6–7 May 2017)
Format: Limited
Attendance: 1595
 Michael Baraniecki
 Eli Kassis
 Evan Esposito
 Martin Dang
 Brian Braun-Duin
 Brad Carpenter
 Thiago Saporito
 Josh Jones

Pro Tour Amonkhet 
Nashville (12–14 May 2017)
 Prize pool: $250,000
 Format: Standard, Booster Draft

Top 8

Final standings

Pro Player of the year standings

Team Series standing

Grand Prix 

GP Montreal (20–21 May 2017)
Format: Standard
Attendance: 850
 Kevin Jones
 Paul Dean
 Maxime Aubin
 Max McVety
 Ethan Gaieski
 Shaun McLaren
 Daniel Fournier
 Liam Kane Meilleur

GP Kobe (27–28 May 2017)
Format: Modern
Attendance: 2802
 Joe Soh
 Terumasa Kojima
 Park Bi-o
 Fumiyasu Suzuike
 Tomoya Tsubouchi
 Takeshi Kagawa
 Akio Chiba
 Ryoichi Tamada

GP Las Vegas 1 (15–16 June 2017)
Format: Legacy
Attendance: 2656
 Andrew Calderon
 Jonathan Semeyn
 Chris Iaali
 Jody Keith
 Patrick Tierney
 Samuel Tharmaratnam
 Jake Haversat
 Daniel Cathro

GP Cleveland (24–25 June 2017)
Format: Team Limited
Attendance: 1611 (537 teams)
1.
 Owen Turtenwald
 William Jensen
 Reid Duke
2.
 Corey Burkhart
 Shuhei Nakamura
 Martin Jůza
3. 
 Nathan Smith
 Brandon Ayers
 John Rolf
4.
 Josh Sellers
 Nick Neill
 Chris Ferber

GP Kyoto (22–23 July 2017)
Format: Limited
Attendance: 2398
 William Jensen
 Atsuki Kihara
 Martin Müller
 Jon Finkel
 Qi Wentao
 Pascal Maynard
 Yang Xiao Yu
 Kazuki Yada

GP Santiago (20–21 May 2017)
Format: Standard
Attendance: 718
 Mauro Sasso
 Grzegorz Kowalski
 Daniel Vega
 Guillherme Merjam
 Javier Luna
 Nicolas Epstein
 Ignacio Saez
 Niels Noorlander

GP Amsterdam (3–4 June 2017)
Format: Standard
Attendance: 1170
 Lukas Blohon
 Benjamin Luft
 Michael Maurici
 Arjan van Leeuwen
 Jelco Bodewes
 Thomas Hendriks
 Alexander Mertins
 Raphael Coors

GP Las Vegas 2 (16–17 June 2017)
Format: Limited
Attendance: 2562
 Thiago Saporito
 Steve Rubin
 Paul Herr
 Samuel Pardee
 Bolun Zhang
 Tzu-Mainn Chen
 Andrew Cuneo
 Mike Sigrist

GP Sydney (24–25 June 2017)
Format: Team Limited
Attendance: 852 (284 teams)
1.
 James Wilks
 Simon Linabury
 Ivan Schroder
2.
 Yuuya Watanabe
 Hajime Nakamura
 Yoshihiko Ikawa
3.
 Jarron Puszet
 Dominic Z
 Karl Lyndon Eyre
4.
 Danny Liao
 Jing-Wei Zheng
 Brandon Wise

GP Copenhagen (27–28 May 2017)
Format: Modern
Attendance: 1815
 Mattia Rizzi 
 Cristian Ortiz Ros 
 Kim Ströh 
 Martin Müller
 Teemu Halonen 
 Remy Le François
 Michael Steinecke 
 Gunnar Geißler

GP Manila (3–4 June 2017)
Format: Modern
Attendance: 757
 Ryoichi Tamada
 Qi Wentao
 Imman Van Valerio
 Wee Pang Ming
 Cholo Pascual
 Mark Anthony Biala
 Rei Anthony Coo
 Dunstan Tauli

GP Las Vegas 3 (17–18 June 2017)
Format: Modern
Attendance: 3264
 Mani Davoudi
 Theau Mery
 Benjamin Coursey
 Allen Wu
 Matt Sorensen
 Craig Wescoe
 Daniel Wong
 Paul Peterson

GP Toronto (22–23 July 2017)
Format: Limited
Attendance: 1395
 Robert Anderson
 Allen Sun
 Matthew Nickolai
 Benjamin Weitz
 Andrew Cuneo
 Doug Potter
 Taimur Rashid
 You Cheng An

Pro Tour Hour of Devastation 
Kyoto (27–30 July 2017)
 Prize pool: $250,000
 Format: Standard, Booster Draft

Top 8

Final standings

Team Series standing

Source:

Pro Player of the Year final standings 
The 2016–17 Pro Tour season ended after Pro Tour Hour of Devastation. These are the final standings of the Player of the Year race, including every player who at the end of the season reached 52 points (Platinum-level, the highest Pro Club Level).

References 

Magic: The Gathering professional events